Risto Kallaste (born 23 February 1971) is an Estonian football manager and former Estonian international footballer who is currently the manager of Flora U19 team. He played as a full back. Kallaste made his first appearance for the Estonia national football team on 3 June 1992, in a historic 1–1 friendly draw against Slovenia. The match was Estonia's first official match since restoration of independence and Slovenia's first ever. He made a total of 36 appearances for the national team.

Style of play
Kallaste was famous for his long range flip throw-ins.

Personal
His son Ken Kallaste is also a footballer.

References

External links
 
 
 Meeting Risto Kallaste, the flip thrown-in father 13 June 2013
 YouTube Video of Risto Kallaste's crazy flip throw-in
 Saltoaut on tagasi! 

1971 births
Living people
Soviet footballers
Estonian footballers
Estonia international footballers
FC Flora players
Viborg FF players
FC Kuressaare players
Nõmme Kalju FC players
Estonian expatriate footballers
Expatriate footballers in Sweden
Estonian expatriate sportspeople in Sweden
Expatriate men's footballers in Denmark
Estonian expatriate sportspeople in Denmark
Footballers from Tallinn
Association football defenders
FC Nõmme United players